Požarevac is a city and the administrative centre of the Braničevo District in eastern Serbia. It is located between three rivers: Danube, Great Morava and Mlava and below the hill Čačalica (208m). As of 2011, the city has a population of 44,183 while the city administrative area has 75,334 inhabitants.

Name
In Serbian, the city is known as Požarevac (Пожаревац), in Romanian as Pojarevăț or Podu Lung, in Turkish as Pasarofça, in German as Passarowitz, and in Hungarian as Pozsarevác.

The name means "fire-town" in Serbian (In this case, the word "fire" is used in the sense of a disaster).

History

Ancient times

In ancient times, the area was inhabited by Thracians, Dacians, and Celts. There was a city at this locality known as Margus in Latin after the Roman conquest in the first century BC.

In 435, the city of Margus, under the Eastern Roman Empire, was the site of a treaty between the Byzantine Empire and the Hun leaders Attila and Bleda. 

One pretext for the Hun invasion of the Eastern Roman Empire in 442 was that the Bishop of Margus had crossed the Danube to ransack and desecrate the royal Hun graves on the north bank of the Danube. When the Romans discussed handing over the Bishop, he slipped away and betrayed the city to the Huns, who then sacked the city and went on to invade as far as the gates of Constantinople itself. 

After the fall of the Hunnic Empire, the area was again controlled by the Eastern Roman Empire. In the 6th century, it was briefly controlled by the Kingdom of the Gepids. Since the 6th century, the area was populated by Slavs, but the Eastern Roman Empire held a nominal control over the region until the 8th century when Balkan Slavs achieved de facto independence from the Eastern Empire. It was also ruled by Avar Khaganate before their demolition by Charlemagne. The area was subsequently included into the Bulgarian Empire and was alternately ruled by the Bulgarian Empire, the Byzantine Empire and the Kingdom of Hungary until the 13th century.

In the 13th century, the area was ruled by independent local Slavic-Bulgarian rulers, Drman and Kudelin. It was subsequently included into the Kingdom of Syrmia, ruled by Serbian king Stefan Dragutin and into the Kingdom of Serbia and Serbian Empire ruled by Stefan Dušan.

Archaeology
A Bronze Age figurine "The Idol of Kličevac" was found in a grave in the village of Kličevac. It was destroyed during World War I.

The National Museum in Belgrade and Požarevac has some 40,000 items found in Viminacium, of which over 700 are of gold and silver. Among them are many invaluable rarities.

In June 2008, a Triballian (Thracian) grave was found with ceramics (urns). These date from the first millennium BC.

Modern city

The modern town of Požarevac was first mentioned in the 14th century under the name Puporače; it first being mentioned under its present-day name in 1476. The town became part of Moravian Serbia and Serbian Despotate, until the Ottoman conquest in 1459. During Ottoman administration, it was part of the Sanjak of Smederevo. It was occupied by Austrian Empire between 1688 and 1690.

In 1718, Požarevac was the site of the signing of the Treaty of Požarevac, with the town then falling under Habsburg control and becoming part of the Habsburg Kingdom of Serbia (from 1718 to 1739). After 1739, the town reverted to Ottoman control except final Austrian occupation between 1789 and 1791. During the First Serbian Uprising (1804–1813), the town was part of the Karađorđe's Serbia. At the end of the uprising in 1813, the town came briefly once more under direct Ottoman control. However, following the Second Serbian Uprising from 1815, the town then became part of the autonomous Ottoman Principality of Serbia. Požarevac was the second capital of the Serbian prince, Miloš Obrenović with the first regular state court in Serbia being established here in 1821. Since 1878, Požarevac became part of the independent Principality of Serbia and since 1882 as part of the Kingdom of Serbia.

Following the end of the First World War in 1918, the town was part of the Kingdom of Serbs, Croats and Slovenes (renamed the Kingdom of Yugoslavia in 1929). From 1929 to 1941, Požarevac was part of the Danube Banovina of the Kingdom of Yugoslavia. During the Axis occupation of Yugoslavia, from 1941 to 1944, it was part of the Territory of the Military Commander in Serbia. From 1944, Požarevac became part of the new socialist Serbia within socialist Yugoslavia. And from 1992, the town became part of the Federal Republic of Yugoslavia (renamed as Serbia and Montenegro in 2003). Since 2006 it has been part of the Republic of Serbia.

Municipalities and settlements
The City of Požarevac includes two city municipalities:
 Požarevac
 Kostolac

These include the following settlements:

In the 2008 reform of Serbian local government, Požarevac received the status of a city and the town of Kostolac became the seat of the second city municipality. Požarevac is the smallest Serbian city consisting of two municipalities.

Demographics

As of 2011, the city of Požarevac has a total population of 75,334 inhabitants.

Ethnic groups
The ethnic composition of the municipal area of the city of Požarevac:

Economy
The following table gives a preview of total number of registered people employed in legal entities per their core activity (as of 2018):

Politics
Seats in the municipality parliament won in the 2020 local elections:
 Serbian Progressive Party (49)
 Socialist Party of Serbia (13)
 The Souverainists (4)
 Vlach Party Bridge (2)

Education
 Požarevac Gymnasium (Požarevačka gimnazija), a college-preparatory high school 
 Technical College (Visoka tehnička škola strukovnih studija u Požarevcu)
 Polytechnic school (Politehnička Škola Požarevac), a collage-preparatory high school

People associated with Požarevac
Filip Soskić, railroad expert and a candidate for president of geographers
Milena Pavlović-Barili, painter and poet
Dimitrije, Patriarch of the Serbian Orthodox Church
Dragana Mirković, singer
Novica Urošević, singer and composer
Saša Ilić, footballer
Velibor Vasović, footballer and manager
Milivoje Živanović, film and stage actor
Bata Paskaljević, stage, film and television actor
Slaviša Žungul, footballer
Prvoslav Vujčić, writer
Đorđe Jovanović, sculptor
Petar Dobrnjac, army commander
Milenko Stojković, army commander
Radmila Manojlović, singer
Slobodan Milošević, politician
Milivoje Stojanović, army commander

International relations

Twin towns – sister cities

Požarevac is twinned with:

Image gallery

See also
Municipalities of Serbia
Cities and towns in Serbia
Populated places of Serbia

References
 Grad Požarevac

Sources

External links

 
 

 
Populated places in Braničevo District
Municipalities and cities of Southern and Eastern Serbia